The following is a list of notable fire departments in Tennessee:

 City of Knoxville Fire Department
 East Sullivan County Volunteer Fire Department
 Memphis Fire Services
 Nashville Fire Department

 
Fire departments